Kings Heath railway station is a railway station under construction in Kings Heath, Birmingham. It was originally opened in 1840 before being closed to passengers in 1941.

History
The station was built on the Birmingham and Gloucester Railway's mainline (now the Camp Hill line) on the border of Kings Heath and Moseley, adjacent to Highbury Park. Upon opening it was called Moseley station, however in 1867 the opening of a new upline station of the same name closer to the centre of Moseley caused the station to be renamed 'Kings Heath'.

The station finally closed to passengers on 27 January 1941 due to the Second World War, although it was used as a goods station and coal yard into the late 1960s. It was demolished at some point thereafter.

Station masters

G. Potter 1860—1872
W. Sibley 1872—1874
A. Nowell 1874—1875
H. Wells 1875—1877
George Stroud 1877—1904
John H. Brayne 1904—1914(formerly station master at Selly Oak)
J.W. Varty 1930—1936
Harry Snary 1937—1941(also station master at Hazelwell from 1937)

Reopening
Since the late 2000s, proposals have been made to re-open the station, along with others on the Camp Hill Line, for passenger use.

In 2019, the project to re-open the stations at Moseley, Kings Heath, and Hazelwell received £15 million in Government funding, with construction due to start in 2020 and aimed for completion in time for the 2022 Commonwealth Games, though this was delayed by the coronavirus pandemic. In March 2021 it was announced that funding had been found for the project, with an opening date expected in 2023.

Construction work on the three new stations started in late 2022 and they are due to reopen in December 2023.

References

Disused railway stations in Birmingham, West Midlands
Railway stations in Great Britain opened in 1840
Railway stations in Great Britain closed in 1941
Former Midland Railway stations